The 2016 BYU Cougars women's volleyball team represented Brigham Young University in the 2016 NCAA Division I women's volleyball season. The Cougars are led by second year head coach Heather Olmstead and play their home games at the Smith Fieldhouse. The Cougars are members of the WCC.

BYU comes off a season where they won the WCC regular season championship and once again participated in the NCAA tournament.

Season highlights 
Season highlights will be filled in as the season progresses.

Roster

Schedule 

 *-Indicates Conference Opponent
 y-Indicates NCAA Playoffs
 Times listed are Mountain Time Zone.

Announcers for televised games 
All home games will be on BYUtv or Campus Insiders TheW.tv. Select road games will also be televised or streamed.

Utah Valley: Spencer Linton, Kristen Kozlowski, & Jason Shepherd
Rice: Spencer Linton, Kristen Kozlowski, & Jason Shepherd
Cal Poly: Spencer Linton, Kristen Kozlowski, & Jason Shepherd
Idaho State: Matt Steuart & Kade Vance
Utah: Spencer Linton, Amy Gant, & Jason Shepherd
CSUN: Spencer Linton, Amy Gant, & Jason Shepherd
UNLV: Mitchell Marshall
Santa Clara: Spencer Linton, Steve Vail, & Jason Shepherd
San Francisco: Robbie Bullough & Mitchell Marshall
Pepperdine: Al Epstein
San Diego: Darren Preston
Saint Mary's: Spencer Linton, Kristen Kozlowski, & Jason Shepherd
Pacific: Mitchell Marshall
Portland: Cody Barton
Gonzaga: No commentary
Pepperdine: Robbie Bullough & Mitchell Marshall
Loyola Marymount: Spencer Linton, Kristen Kozlowski, & Jason Shepherd
San Diego: Spencer Linton, Kristen Kozlowski, & Jason Shepherd
Pacific: Don Gubbins
Saint Mary's: Alex Jensen
Gonzaga: Spencer Linton, Kristen Kozlowski, & Jason Shepherd
Portland: Mitchell Marshall
San Francisco: Pat Olsen
Santa Clara: No commentary
Loyola Marymount: Paul Sunderland & Dain Blanton
Princeton: Spencer Linton, Kristen Kozlowski, & Jason Shepherd
UNLV: Spencer Linton, Kristen Kozlowski, & Jason Shepherd
Texas: Tiffany Greene & Maria Taylor

References 

2016 team
2016 in sports in Utah
2016 West Coast Conference volleyball